Caín y Abel is an Argentine telenovela, produced by Telefe. Lead actors are Joaquín Furriel, Fabián Vena, Julieta Cardinali, Vanesa González, Federico D'Elía, Luis Machín, Virginia Lago and Luis Brandoni. The plot involves two brothers that hate each other, but it's unrelated to the Cain and Abel biblical story beyond that: they work together at a real estate firm, and fight for the love of a woman.

Development
The telenovela was made to compete against the successful Showmatch of competitor channel 13. The soundtrack is "Sin Fin", the first song written by Andrés Calamaro specifically for a TV series. It is directed by Miguel Colom, who had worked at Vidas Robadas.

The first episode of the Telenovela had a rating of 14,5.

Cast
 Joaquín Furriel as Agustín Vedia
 Fabián Vena as Simón Vedia
 Julieta Cardinali as Leonora Mendóza
 Vanesa González as Valentina Paz
 Luis Brandoni as Eugenio Vedia
 Virginia Lago as Consuelo Vedia 
 Federico D'Elía as Alfredo Rincón

References

2010s Argentine television series
2010 telenovelas
2010 Argentine television series debuts
2010 Argentine television series endings
Telefe telenovelas
Spanish-language telenovelas